The following list includes notable people who were born or have lived in Kankakee, Illinois. For a similar list organized alphabetically by last name, see the category page People from Kankakee, Illinois.

Film, television, and theater 

 Jordan Black (born 1970), actor
 David Bruce (1914–1976), actor
 Bryan Dattilo (born 1971), actor
 Kristin Dattilo (born 1970), actress
 Merna Kennedy (1908–1944), actress
 Fred MacMurray (1908–1991), actor, star of more than 100 films and TV series My Three Sons
 Nancy Snyder (born 1949), actress
 Randy Spears (born 1961), actor
 Kara Zediker, actress
 Actor [Alex Morris]
 Actor [Rico Ross]

Literature and media 

 Jill De Vries (born 1953), Playboy Playmate, October 1975
 Harold Gray (1894–1968), creator of Little Orphan Annie
 Paul Hendrickson (born 1944), author

Military 
 Thomas V. Draude (born 1940), decorated U.S. Marine officer
 Harry Stella (1916–1997), decorated U.S. Army colonel

Music 

 Gregory Kunde (born 1954), operatic tenor
 Yea Big, musician
 Doodie Lo , rapper
 Eric Swanson, musician

Politics and law 
 Benjamin W. Alpiner (1867–1946), Illinois state legislator and mayor of Kankakee
 Louis E. Beckman (1876–1946), Illinois state legislator and mayor of Kankakee
 Louis E. Beckman Jr. (1914–1992), Illinois state legislator; born in Kankakee
 John Benoit (1951–2016), California state legislator, was born in Kankakee.
 Edward McBroom (1925–1990), Illinois state legislator and businessman
 Mary K. O'Brien (born 1965), Illinois state legislator and judge, was born in Kankakee.
 Daniel H. Paddock (1852–1905), Illinois state representative and lawyer, lived in Kankakee.
 George Ryan (born 1934), 39th governor of Illinois
 Samuel H. Shapiro (1907–1987), 34th Governor of Illinois, practiced law in Kankakee and died there at age 79
 Lennington Small (1862–1936), 26th governor of Illinois
 Chastity Wells-Armstrong (born 1971/1972), first African-American to serve as mayor of Kankakee
 Hamilton K. Wheeler (August 5, 1848 – July 19, 1918) was an Illinois State Senator and U.S. Representative from Kankakee
 Herman W. Snow (1836–1914), U.S. representative, Civil War captain, lived and died in Kankakee.
 Rick Winkel (born 1956), Illinois state legislator, was born in Kankakee.
 Adam Kinzinger (born 1978), United States House member from 2011 to 2023 and Lieutenant Colonel (United States) in the Air National Guard, was born in Kankakee.

Science and art 
 George Grey Barnard (1863–1938), sculptor, raised in Kankakee
 Vernon W. Hughes (1921–2003), physicist, born in Kankakee

Sports 

 Rube Foster (1879–1930), baseball Hall of Famer, died in Kankakee
 Tyjuan Hagler (born 1981), NFL linebacker and Super Bowl (XLI) champion
 Scott Meents (born 1964), NBA player, born in Kankakee
 Ted Petersen (born 1955), NFL offensive lineman
 Billy Petrick (born 1984), MLB pitcher
 Tom Prince (born 1964), MLB catcher, born in Kankakee
 Joie Ray (1894–1978), three-time Olympian, bronze medalist, born in Kankakee
 Mike Russow (born 1976), UFC mixed martial artist
 Harv Schmidt (born 1935), college basketball coach
 Jack Sikma (born 1955), Hall of Fame NBA player from 1976–91, born in Kankakee
 Jimmy Smith (born 1960), NFL running back
 Lorenzo Smith III (born 1978), Olympic bobsledder
 Bruce Vaughan (born 1956), professional golfer
 Terry Wells (born 1963), MLB pitcher

  
Johnathan Ward https://en.m.wikipedia.org/wiki/Jonathan_Ward_(American_football)

Other 
 Lemuel Milk (1820–1893), landowner, businessman, lived and died in Kankakee
 John Moisant (1868–1910), aviation pioneer, born in Kankakee

References 

Kankakee
People from Kankakee, Illinois
Kankakee